Emily Syme (born 23 July 2000) is an English professional footballer who plays as a midfielder for Bristol City W.F.C..

Career
Having previously played for Bristol City, Syme signed her first professional contract with Yeovil Town in 2018, before joining Aston Villa in July 2019.

On 26 January 2022, Aston Villa announced that Syme had left the club by mutual consent.

She has played for England at under-17, under-19 and under-21 levels.

Career statistics

References

External links

2000 births
Living people
English women's footballers
Women's association football midfielders
Bristol City W.F.C. players
Yeovil Town L.F.C. players
Aston Villa W.F.C. players
Women's Super League players
Women's Championship (England) players
England women's youth international footballers
England women's under-21 international footballers
Sheffield United W.F.C. players